"I Build This Garden for Us" is a song by American rock musician Lenny Kravitz, released in 1990 by Virgin Records as the second single from his debut album, Let Love Rule (1989).

Critical reception
In an review on 3 February 1990, Simon Reynolds of Melody Maker named the musician a "hi-fibre, organic version of Prince" and summarized on a single, "Well made, but not what you could call 'music'". John Mackie from The Vancouver Sun declared it an "standout" from Let Love Rule, noting that the song "sounds like it was teleported in from the golden era of psychedelia".

Track listing
"I Build This Garden for Us" – 6:16 (Kravitz)
"Flower Child" – 2:56 (Kravitz)
"Fear" – 5:25 (Kravitz, Lisa Bonet)

Members 
 Lenny Kravitz – vocals, guitar, drums
 Jean McClain – backing vocals
 Yolanda Pittman – backing vocals
 Tisha Campbell – backing vocals
 Nancy Ives – cello
 Henry Hirsch – bass, organ, electric piano (Rhodes piano)
 Eric Delente – violin

Charts

References

External links
Lenny Kravitz official site

1990 singles
Lenny Kravitz songs
Song recordings produced by Lenny Kravitz
Songs written by Lenny Kravitz
1989 songs
Virgin Records singles